Parcevall Hall -- also known as Parceval Hall -- and its gardens are located at Skyreholme near Appletreewick village, Wharfedale, North Yorkshire, England. It features a Grade II* listed manor house and landscaped gardens. Currently owned by Walsingham College and leased by the Diocese of Bradford, it is used as a retreat house and conference centre.

The gardens comprise  of displays, featuring trees and shrubs and herbaceous borders. They are the largest and the only Royal Horticultural Society and English Heritage registered gardens open to the public in the Yorkshire Dales National Park. Created from 1927 onwards they began falling into decline after 1960 following the death  of Sir William Milner, 8th Baronet of Nun Appleton. In the mid 1980s, the gardens began to be restored; a process which spanned 25 years.

The gardens are open to the public from April to October.

References

External links

Parcevall Hall Gardens

Gardens in North Yorkshire
Grade II* listed buildings in North Yorkshire
Wharfedale